Rita Kirst (née Schmidt on 21 October 1950) is a retired German high jumper. She competed at the 1968, 1972 and 1976 Summer Olympics and finished in fifth, fifth and 22nd place, respectively. Between 1968 and 1974 she won three gold and two bronze medals at the European indoor championships. Her personal best is 1.92 m (1974).

She became East German champion six times in a row from 1967 through 1972, then won three silver medals in 1973, 1974 and 1976 and a final gold medal in 1975. She also became East German indoor champion in 1968, 1969, 1970 and 1972. She competed for the sports club SC DHfK Leipzig, and after marrying, ASK Vorwärts Potsdam.

In 1972 she married Joachim Kirst, an Olympic decathlete, and later competed as Rita Kirst. Her sister-in-law Jutta Kirst won a bronze medal in high jump at the 1980 Olympics.

References

1950 births
Living people
East German female high jumpers
Athletes (track and field) at the 1968 Summer Olympics
Athletes (track and field) at the 1972 Summer Olympics
Athletes (track and field) at the 1976 Summer Olympics
Olympic athletes of East Germany
SC DHfK Leipzig athletes